Anthony Richard (born December 20, 1996) is a Canadian professional ice hockey forward who is currently playing for the Laval Rocket  in the American Hockey League (AHL) while under contract for the Montreal Canadiens of the National Hockey League (NHL).

Playing career
Richard played major junior hockey with the Val-d'Or Foreurs of the Quebec Major Junior Hockey League and was drafted by the Nashville Predators in 4th round of the 2015 NHL Entry Draft, 100th overall.

In his fourth and final season with the Foreurs in 2015–16, Richard was signed to a three-year, entry-level contract with the Nashville Predators on November 14, 2015.

In the 2018–19 season, Richard was recalled from AHL affiliate, the Milwaukee Admirals, to the Predators on December 1, 2018 due to an injury to forward Filip Forsberg and made his NHL debut the same day against the Chicago Blackhawks in a 5–2 victory. He was returned to the Admirals following the game.

During the  season, having contributed with 7 goals and 12 points through 31 regular season games with the Milwaukee Admirals while in the midst of his sixth year within the Predators organization, Richard was traded to the Tampa Bay Lightning in exchange for Jimmy Huntington on February 1, 2022.

On July 13, 2022, Richard signed as a free agent to a one-year, two-way contract with the Montreal Canadiens for the  season. With his customary jersey number 20 already in use by Juraj Slafkovský, Richard instead adopted number 90, in reference to iconic Canadiens player Maurice "Rocket" Richard's number 9. He was assigned to play with the Canadiens' AHL affiliate Laval Rocket, and made an immediate impact even as the team struggled. His performance with the team was sufficiently strong to begin debate as to whether or when he might be called up to play in the NHL. On December 18, the Canadiens announced that he had been called up from the Rocket. At the time of the call, Richard had scored a league-leading 18 goals in 27 games, and with 31 points was third in the points standings. He made his debut for the Canadiens in a December 19 game against the Arizona Coyotes.
On December 21, 2022, he scored his first NHL goal against the Colorado Avalanche, on a breakaway deke against golatender Alexandar Georgiev. Richard played seven games with the Canadiens before returning to the Rocket.

Career statistics

Regular season and playoffs

International

References

External links

1996 births
Living people
Canadian ice hockey centres
Chicago Wolves players
Cincinnati Cyclones (ECHL) players
Laval Rocket players
Milwaukee Admirals players
Montreal Canadiens players
Nashville Predators draft picks
Nashville Predators players
Syracuse Crunch players
Val-d'Or Foreurs players